Agee may refer to:

 Agee (surname), including a list of people with the surname
 Agee (film), a 1980 documentary film
 Agee Creek, a stream in Missouri
 Agee (biblical figure), a minor biblical character

See also
 Gee (surname)
 AG (disambiguation)